Lady Catherine Anna Brudenell-Bruce (born 25 November 1984), known as Bo Bruce, is an English singer-songwriter previously signed to Mercury Records. She has released one EP, Search the Night (2010), and an album Before I Sleep in 2013, both of which received a degree of chart success. She is also known for her appearance on talent show The Voice UK, and has toured mainly around the UK. Throughout her career she has featured on a number of dance-oriented singles, notably with Chicane and Gareth Emery.

Early life
Bo Bruce was born Lady Catherine Anna Brudenell-Bruce, the daughter of David Brudenell-Bruce, Earl of Cardigan, and his first wife, Rosamond Winkley. Bruce is also a granddaughter of Michael Brudenell-Bruce, 8th Marquess of Ailesbury. She has an older brother, Thomas Brudenell-Bruce, Viscount Savernake. Her family's seat is Tottenham House, set on a 4,500-acre estate in Wiltshire near Savernake Forest, and she and her brother grew up at Savernake Lodge on the estate. Bruce was close to her mother, who died of pancreatic cancer in 2012, while she is estranged from her father. She won a High Court action in February 2022 when her brother was removed as administrator of their mother's estate. Bruce is also a distant cousin of lingerie model Florence Brudenell-Bruce, and was educated at Marlborough College in Wiltshire and Port Regis, in Dorset.

Music career

2008–11: Early career and Search the Night EP
Bruce began writing for her debut release, an EP entitled Search The Night, which was digitally released on 12 December 2010. It was produced by Tom Marsh, who co-wrote three of the songs and played a number of instruments. It featured the songs "Behind The Gates", "Waking", "Fighting Arizona", "Crossfire", and "Black Ice"; the latter was submitted upon applying for the Channel 4 competition while "Fighting Arizona" was performed during the broadcast. Music videos were made for both "Fighting Arizona" (August 2010) and "Black Ice" (September 2011). Sales of the EP began to increase after Bruce became featured on The Voice UK and peaked at number two on the iTunes album charts on 4 June 2012.

On 1 August 2011, she released her collaboration with DJ's/Producers Simon Patterson and Greg Downey called "Come to Me".

2012: The Voice UK

In her blind audition Bruce sang the David Guetta/Usher hit "Without You". Coaches will.i.am and Danny O'Donoghue turned round in a bid to add her to their teams and  she opted to join Team Danny. In the battle round Bruce performed with Vince Freeman, duetting on the U2 classic "With or Without You", after which O'Donoghue put her through to the live rounds. During the live show of 5 May 2012, Bruce sang "Running Up That Hill" by Kate Bush and received praise from all four coaches and was voted through to the next round of the competition with the viewers' vote. She received the praise of the songwriter Kate Bush, who congratulated Bruce on her "fantastic performance" and noted that the performance was "really beautiful and moving".

2012: Post The Voice UK
During the broadcast of the voice, her collaboration with Mike Shiver called 'Still Here' was released on Armada sub-label S107 Recordings.

In the week following The Voice UK final, Bruce's independently released Search the Night EP charted at No. 19. Soon after this, she announced being signed to Mercury Records. She performed her debut show at The Garage on 16 August 2012, followed by a performance at the V Festival and T in the Park. Bruce featured on the track "Damaged" by DJ/Producer Kryder, released as a download-only single in October 2012. Shortly after the end of The Voice UK sessions for her debut album began.

The music video for a song entitled "The Fall" was released on 27 November 2012, while it was confirmed that the track would be also appearing on the debut album. Her first single "Save Me" and album Before I Sleep were scheduled for release on 29 April 2013.  The title by the poem "Stopping by Woods on a Snowy Evening", written by Robert Frost. In March 2013, Bruce signed a publishing deal with Polar Patrol Publishing, which was set up by members of Snow Patrol and currently publishes a number of artists and songwriters, including Johnny McDaid of Snow Patrol and Here We Go Magic. Upon release the album reached no. 10 in the UK Album Chart.

On 24 April 2013, it was announced that Bruce had collaborated on a track with Gary Lightbody of Snow Patrol, entitled "The Rage That's in Us All", for the motion picture Star Trek Into Darkness released in cinemas on 9 May 2013.

Bruce's relationship with her label Mercury began to deteriorate after the release of second single "Alive", which Bruce believed had been under-promoted. This signalled the end of her working relationship with Mercury Records. A third single had been planned but the singer 'put a stop to it going out [and] pulled the video'. She cited a lack of support at the label for her departure. In September 2013 it was confirmed that Bruce had entered rehab citing exhaustion.

In January 2014, "U" by Gareth Emery, featuring vocals from Bo Bruce, was released and was voted by the listeners of Armin van Buuren radio show 'A State Of Trance' as Tune of the Year 2014. In October 2014, she featured on the new Chicane single "Still With Me" and has made appearances with both artists.

In 2015, she teamed up with her husband, electronic musician Henry Binns (from Zero 7), as "Equador". The project has released two singles within 2016, entitled "Blood" and "Bones of Man" and the album Bones Of Man. In 2019 Equador released the Tribal War EP featuring 3 new tracks including Treble Oh.

Discography

Studio albums
 Before I Sleep (2013)

Extended plays
 Search the Night (2010)

References

External links
 

1984 births
Living people
English rock singers
English women singer-songwriters
Bo
Daughters of British earls
People from Wiltshire
People educated at Marlborough College
The Voice UK contestants
English women pop singers
21st-century English women singers
21st-century English singers
21st-century English people